Amine Salama (born 18 July 2000) is a French professional footballer who plays as a forward for  club Angers.

Club career
A youth product of Montrouge, Salama began his senior career with Dunkerque in 2022. He made his professional debut with Dunkerque in a 1–1 Ligue 2 tie with Paris FC on 28 January 2022.

In June 2022, Salama signed a four-year contract with Angers.

Personal life
Born in France, Salama is of Moroccan descent.

References

External links
 

2000 births
Living people
French sportspeople of Moroccan descent
French footballers
Footballers from Paris
Association football forwards
Ligue 1 players
Ligue 2 players
USL Dunkerque players
Angers SCO players